Skull Caps, the RTS video game sequel to Baldies, was developed by Creative Edge Software and published by Ubi Soft in 1998. Available localizations include English, French, German, Italian, Spanish versions.

Gameplay 

Player takes command of creatures named  that are pitted against hairies. There are 45 levels. Map of each level is made upon real landscapes. To proceed to the other level  have to destroy all hostile units and buildings.

Gamers have options to play single player or LAN.

Facts 
Skull Caps is a sequel to Baldies, real-time strategy game by Creative Edge Software.

References

External links 
 
 Skull Caps at MobyGames

1999 video games
Construction and management simulation games
Creative Edge Software games
God games
Multiplayer and single-player video games
Real-time strategy video games
Ubisoft games
Video games developed in the United Kingdom
Windows games
Windows-only games